Out Front! is an album by pianist Jaki Byard recorded in 1964 (with one track from the 1961 session that produced Here's Jaki) and released on the Prestige label.

Reception

Allmusic awarded the album 2½ stars with its review by Scott Yanow stating, "this is a surprisingly conventional set... It's fine music but one has to lower expectations a bit".

The Penguin Guide to Jazz, on the other hand, gave the album a 4 star review, remarking "the early Prestige and New Jazz sets … are uniformly excellent.  Out Front! remains our favorite, largely because it shows off Byard's infallible instinct for horn voicings. Tracks like 'European Episode' and 'Lush Life' are well worth studying in some detail."

Track listing 
All compositions by Jaki Byard except where noted
 "Out Front"  - 4:18   
 "Two Different Worlds"  (Al Frisch, Sid Wayne) - 5:25   
 "Searchlight" - 7:06   
 "European Episode" - 12:02   
 "Lush Life"  (Billy Strayhorn) - 3:23   
 "When Sunny Gets Blue" (Marvin Fisher, Jack Segal) - 5:08   
 "I Like to Lead When I Dance" (Sammy Cahn, Jimmy Van Heusen) - 2:30   
 "After the Lights Go Down Low" (Phil Belmonte, Leroy Lovett, Alan White) - 4:50

Personnel 
Jaki Byard - piano, alto saxophone (track 6)
Richard Williams - trumpet (tracks 3, 4, 7 & 8)
Booker Ervin - tenor saxophone (tracks 3, 4, 7 & 8) 
Ron Carter (track 6), Bob Cranshaw (tracks 1-5, 7 & 8) - bass
Roy Haynes (track 6), Walter Perkins (tracks 1-5, 7 & 8) - drums

References 

Jaki Byard albums
1965 albums
Albums produced by Esmond Edwards
Albums recorded at Van Gelder Studio
Prestige Records albums